Talus MB-764 is a four-wheel drive launch tractor which was specifically designed for the RNLI, to launch and recover  inflatable inshore lifeboats from beach and shorebased launched lifeboat stations.
The Tractor is produced by the British company of Clayton Engineering Limited who are based in Knighton, Powys.

Development 
The MB-764 was the first launch tractor designed and developed in conjunction with the RNLI to launch the institutions smaller inshore inflatable lifeboat fleet. Clayton’s based the design of the MB-764 on Ford County Commercial Cars. At the design and development stage the company presented two Prototype models. The first being the main take up by the RNLI. The first of these launch tractors went into service with the RNLI in 1975 and since then over 30 tractors have been operated by the Institute around the United Kingdom and Ireland. The basic design, operating and performance characteristics have not changed from the initial design concept vehicle, with the exception of the propelled wading capability.

RNLI Talus MB 764 Fleet

See also 
 Talus MB-H Launch tractor
 Talus MB-4H launch tractor
 TC45 launch tractor
 Talus Atlantic 85 DO-DO launch carriage

References 

Royal National Lifeboat Institution launch vehicles
Sea-going tractors
Tractors
Rescue equipment